Guaru may refer to:

Guarú (Rodrigo Neves de Freitas, born 1981), Brazilian footballer 
Guarú language, an extinct Arawakan language of Colombia
Rosa Guarú (fl. c. 1780), nurse of Argentine general José de San Martín